Hale Farm and Village is a historic property of the Western Reserve Historical Society in Bath Township, Summit County, Ohio, United States.  It is within the boundaries of the Cuyahoga Valley National Park.  Hale Farm was the original homestead of Jonathan Hale, a Connecticut farmer who migrated to the Western Reserve in 1810. In 1973 Hale Farm was listed on the National Register of Historic Places as the Jonathan Hale Homestead.  The Hale House was built in 1825.

Wheatfield

The Western Reserve Historical Society opened Hale Farm in 1958 after receiving the property from Clara Belle Ritchie, descendant of Jonathan Hale.

The eastern half of Hale Farm and Village is a living history museum that has a variety of historical buildings, most relocated from elsewhere.  This recreated village is called Wheatfield. The majority of Wheatfield's structures are inhabited by people who present information on their location but acknowledge the modern world. This technique is known as third-person interpretation. First-person interpretation means that the inhabitants of a structure work as actors who play out the livelihood of a certain year and setting.  The timeframe reenacted by the first-person interpreters at Wheatfield was 1862 in 2007. Each year, the actors will move forward one year, until they reach 1865, the end of the American Civil War, at which point they will revert to 1861, which was the beginning of the war.  They also offer programs such as A Fugitive's Path to Freedom.

Hale Farm and Village also has demonstrations of various nineteenth-century trades such as candle, broom, and brick making, glass blowing, and a blacksmith shop.

See also
 Alfred Kelley mansion
 National Register of Historic Places listings in Summit County, Ohio

References

External links

National Register of Historic Places in Summit County, Ohio
Houses on the National Register of Historic Places in Ohio
Houses completed in 1825
Museums in Summit County, Ohio
Living museums in Ohio
Farm museums in Ohio
Houses in Summit County, Ohio
Blacksmith shops